KNIL-LP (95.9 FM, "Creighton Community Radio") is a radio station licensed to serve the community of Creighton, Nebraska. The station is owned by St. Ludgerus Catholic Church and airs a community radio format.

The station was assigned the KNIL-LP call letters by the Federal Communications Commission on April 9, 2014.

References

External links
 Official Website
 FCC Public Inspection File for KNIL-LP
 

NIL-LP
NIL-LP
Radio stations established in 2015
2015 establishments in Nebraska
Community radio stations in the United States
Knox County, Nebraska